Joshua Citarella is an artist, researcher, and Twitch streamer from New York City who studies online communities.

Early life and education 
Citarella attended the School of Visual Arts in New York, where he learned both traditional darkroom photography and digital techniques while the school transitioned its focus from the former to the latter.

Work 
After graduation, Citarella collaborated with an artist collective that focused on digital culture and advertising. His ongoing work with Brad Troemel began at this time with The Jogging. The Jogging began in 2009 as a Tumblr blog on which thousands of strange images were posted. In 2017, Citarella continued his collaboration with Troemel, working with him on an Etsy art store called Ultra Violet Production House. As of January 2017, the two had put up seventy-eight works of art for sale, most of them made of everyday object in a manner that developed a sense of absurdity. For example, items placed for sale included a couch covered in hardcore-punk-band patches and a bench built from two Apple computers topped with a plank of wood.

In 2013, Citarella debuted with a series of five chromogenic still lifes at Higher Pictures. These prints included Body Anointed with Nitroglycerin Awaits Transfiguration, depicting a "reclining nude woman, partially covered in silver, with little flecks of skin and paint floating around her," with some of the nitroglycerin smudging the frame. Andrew Russeth of The Observer describes the work as showing "exacting detail" instilling in viewers a "discomfort [that]...is also a sign that Mr. Citarella is closely attuned to the intricate traps of image production today."

Citarella presented his triptych SWIM A Few Years From Now at that Armory Show. It depicts his vision of an anarcho-capitalist future America. Writing for Artsy, Scott Indrisek notes that the piece displays "a canny blend of analog photography and digital trickery, with many images borrowed from the internet... [it] has the slickness of a dystopian IKEA catalog spread."

In 2017, Citarella was supporting himself with varied freelance and temporary jobs, including commercial photo editing and gallery photography for New York galleries. Citarella has reworked aspects of his freelancing work into his own art pieces.

Citarella's wrote the book Politigram & the Post-Left, published in 2018, a short version of which is available on his website. The book is a research project covering esoteric political accounts on Instagram collectively within the "Politigram" community (short for "Political Instagram"). The short version contains screenshots of memes and profiles from the platform. The long version, in addition, "include[s] feedback, interviews, conversations and census data sent by the users themselves." It "was available at a bookstore in the east village of NYC. Somewhere during mid October, a Politigram user visited the store and purchased the book". His other book, from 2020, is called 20 Interviews, which, as implied by the title, is a collection of interviews from users on Politigram.

In 2019, Citarella worked as an adjunct at the School of Visual Arts.

As of 2020, Citarella's main projects are a podcast and a Twitch account, both of which he uses to discuss current events, Politigram subcultures, and studies in the ways that social media affects radicalization.

References

School of Visual Arts alumni
1987 births
Living people
Twitch (service) streamers